Patrick Kuma-Aboagye is a Ghanaian medical doctor and senior public health specialist who is currently the Director-General of the Ghana Health Service.

Career

Ghana Health Service 
Kuma-Aboagye was appointed Director-General of the Ghana Health Service by President Nana Akufo-Addo on 25 November 2019 to replace Dr. Anthony Nsiah-Asare who had been as the Presidential Advisor on Health. Prior to his appointment as Director-General, he was the Director for Family Health Division of the Ghana Health Service, a position he held from 2014 to 2019.

References 

Living people
Ghanaian civil servants
Year of birth missing (living people)
Ghanaian public health doctors